Shumovka, rural localities in Russia, may refer to:

 Shumovka, Kostroma Oblast, a locality (rus. kordon)
 Shumovka, Kursk Oblast, a village
 Shumovka (settlement), Smolensk Oblast, a settlement
 Shumovka (village), Smolensk Oblast, a village
 Shumovka, Uljanovsk Oblast, a selo